Enchelycore schismatorhynchus is a moray eel found in coral reefs in the Pacific and Indian Oceans. It was first named by Bleeker in 1853, and is commonly known as the white-margined moray, brown moray eel, or the funnel-nostril moray.

Distribution and habitat

References

schismatorhynchus
Fish described in 1853